Anna Bravo (1938 – 8 December 2019) was an Italian social historian and feminist.

She was an associate professor of social history at the University of Turin, and a member of the Italian Society of Female Historians. She listed her research interests as holocaust and genocide Studies, cosmology (anthropology), and philology.

She was associated with the Alexander Langer Foundation, as a member of its Scientific Board of the Institute for the study of the Resistance Movement and of Contemporary Society.

Selected publications
 
 
 A_Bravo_Noi e la violenza, trent’anni per pensarci [Genesis 2004]

References

1938 births
2019 deaths
20th-century Italian historians
Italian women historians
Academic staff of the University of Turin
21st-century Italian historians